Thirteen is a British drama serial created and written by Marnie Dickens. The series centres on Ivy Moxam (Jodie Comer), a 26-year-old woman who escapes from the cellar where she has been imprisoned for 13 years, and the impact on her family.

The first episode was released on BBC Three in the UK on 28 February 2016. It began airing on BBC America in the United States on 23 June 2016. Each episode was broadcast on BBC Two a week after its release, with the first on 6 March 2016. In Saudi Arabia and the rest of the Middle East, the series began airing in the middle of August 2016.

On 27 March 2016, Dickens stated that there would not be a second series of the show as it was intended to be one-off.

Cast
Jodie Comer as  Ivy Moxam 
Aneurin Barnard as Tim Hobson
Valene Kane as D.S. Lisa Merchant
Richard Rankin as D.I. Elliott Carne
Natasha Little as Christina Moxam
Stuart Graham as Angus Moxam
Peter McDonald as Mark White
Joe Layton as Craig Watts
Katherine Rose Morley as Emma Moxam
Eleanor Wyld as Eloise Wye
Ariyon Bakare as Chief Supt Burridge
Nicholas Farrell as Henry Stone
Kemi-Bo Jacobs as Yazz
Melina Matthews as Sofía Marín
Chipo Chung as Alia Symes
Colin Mace as DSI Harold Winters
Suzette Llewellyn as Angela Hill
Charles Babalola as Jesse

Episodes

Production
The series was shot on location in Bristol. The finale is set in a house in the Lockleaze suburb of Bristol, featuring the Purdown BT Tower, which is mentioned by name in the show.

The title music is "In Your Dreams" from the album Wild Go by Dark Dark Dark. The final episode features a cover of Royal Blood's "Out of the Black" by Billie Marten.

DVD release and streaming
Thirteen was released on DVD on Region 2 in the United Kingdom and Ireland from 2 Entertain on 18 April 2016, on Region 1 in the United States and Canada via Acorn DVD and BBC DVD on 2 August 2016, and on Region 4 in Australia on 7 September 2016. The series has also been released on DVD in Germany from distribution company Polyband on 27 January 2017.

The series is also available for streaming or purchase via Amazon Video, and was available for streaming on the BBC iPlayer until mid-2020.

References

External links
 

2010s British crime television series
2010s British drama television series
2016 British television series debuts
2016 British television series endings
2010s British mystery television series
BBC high definition shows
BBC television dramas
British crime drama television series
English-language television shows
Television shows shot in Bristol
Television shows set in Bristol
2010s British television miniseries